The 2018–19 Northwestern State Lady Demons basketball team will represent Northwestern State University during the 2018–19 NCAA Division I women's basketball season. The Demons, led by third year head coach Jordan Dupuy, will play their home games at Prather Coliseum and were members of the Southland Conference. They finished the season 11–18, 6–12 in Southland play to finish in eighth place. Due to a tie breaker loss to New Orleans they failed to qualify for the Southland women's tournament.

Previous season
The Lady Demons finished the 2017–18 season 7–22, 2–16 in Southland play to finish in twelfth place. They failed to qualify for the Southland women's tournament.

Roster
Sources:

Schedule
Sources:

|-
!colspan=9 style=| Non-conference regular season

|-
!colspan=9 style=| Southland Conference Schedule

See also
2018–19 Northwestern State Demons basketball team

References

Northwestern State
Northwestern State Lady Demons basketball seasons
Northwestern State
Northwestern State